Podgorac is a village in the municipality of Boljevac, Serbia. According to the 2002 census, the village has a population of 2218 people.

There is an 18th-century Ottoman Turkish public fountain built with the funds donated by a certain Osman Bey and therefore named (in Serbian) Osmanbegova česma. 

For a brief period in 1840/41 school year, Đura Jakšić was a village school teacher here.

Notable people
Predrag Balašević

References

Populated places in Zaječar District